Georgios Papastamkos (born 5 March 1955 in Platanorrevma, West Macedonia) is a Greek politician and was a Member of the European Parliament (MEP) from 2004 to 2014 for New Democracy; part of the European People's Party.

References

External links
 

1955 births
Living people
New Democracy (Greece) MEPs
MEPs for Greece 2004–2009
MEPs for Greece 2009–2014
People from Servia